The AO Shirley Recreation Ground is a multi-use stadium in Road Town, British Virgin Islands. It is currently used mostly for football matches and usually hosts the British Virgin Islands national football team's games. The stadium holds 1,500 people.

History 
The Ground was named in honor of Alexander O. Shirley in June 1990. Shirley, a cricketer who also served as the Accountant General of the British Virgin Islands from 1967 to 1987, had requested land to build the ground from the Administrator of the British Virgin Islands. Shirley remains the only British Virgin Islander to have a ground named for him.

Cricket 

The ground has also been used as a venue for cricket matches, with the first recorded cricket match played there in 1988 between a Combined Virgin Islands and Nevis. Three years later, the British Virgin Islands cricket team first played there against Anguilla in the 1991 Leeward Islands Tournament. Just over a decade later, the Leeward Islands played a first-class match there against the Windward Islands in the 2001/02 Busta Cup. This is the only first-class match to be played at the ground. The last recorded cricket match played there was in 2005. The grounds end names are the Police Station End and the Super Value End.

References

External links
A. O. Shirley Recreation Ground at ESPNcricinfo
A. O. Shirley Recreation Ground at CricketArchive

Football venues in the British Virgin Islands
Cricket grounds in the British Virgin Islands
Athletics (track and field) venues in the British Virgin Islands
British Virgin Islands
Road Town